Daşbaşı or Dashbashy may refer to:
 Daşbaşı, Khojavend, Azerbaijan
 Daşbaşı, Khojaly, Azerbaijan
 Daşbaşı, Jabrayil, Azerbaijan
 Dash Bashi, Iran